In astronomy, lunar orbit (also known as a selenocentric orbit) is the orbit of an object around the Moon.

As used in the space program, this refers not to the orbit of the Moon about the Earth, but to orbits by spacecraft around the Moon. The altitude at apoapsis (point farthest from the center of attraction) for a lunar orbit is known as apolune, apocynthion, or aposelene, while the periapsis (point closest to the center of attraction) is known as perilune, pericynthion, or periselene, from names or epithets of the moon goddess.

Lunar orbit insertion (LOI) is the adjustment to achieve lunar orbit, as undertaken by Apollo spacecraft for example.

Low lunar orbit (LLO) are orbits below  altitude. They have a period of about 2 hours. They are of particular interest in exploration of the Moon, but suffer from gravitational perturbation effects that make most unstable, and leave only a few orbital inclinations possible for indefinite frozen orbits, useful for long-term stays in LLO.

Robotic spacecraft

The Soviet Union sent the first spacecraft to the vicinity of the Moon, the robotic vehicle Luna 1, on January 4, 1959.  It passed within  of the Moon's surface, but did not achieve lunar orbit.  Luna 3, launched on October 4, 1959, was the first robotic spacecraft to complete a circumlunar free return trajectory, still not a lunar orbit, but a figure-8 trajectory which swung around the far side of the Moon and returned to the Earth. This craft provided the first pictures of the far side of the Lunar surface.

The Luna 10 became the first spacecraft to actually orbit the Moon in April 1966.  It studied micrometeoroid flux, and lunar environment until May 30, 1966. A follow-on mission, Luna 11, was launched on August 24, 1966, and studied lunar gravitational anomalies, radiation and solar wind measurements.

The first United States spacecraft to orbit the Moon was Lunar Orbiter 1 on August 14, 1966. Five such spacecraft were launched over a period of thirteen months, all of which successfully mapped the Moon, primarily for the purpose of finding suitable Apollo program landing sites.

The most recent was the Lunar Atmosphere and Dust Environment Explorer (LADEE), which became a ballistic impact experiment in 2014.

Crewed spacecraft
The Apollo program's Command/Service Module (CSM) remained in a lunar parking orbit while the Lunar Module (LM) landed. 
Orbital periods vary according to the sum of apoapsis and periapsis, and for the CSM were about two hours. After the second landing mission, the procedure was changed on Apollo 14 to save more of the LM fuel for its powered descent, by using the CSM's fuel to perform the DOI burn, and later raising its periapsis back to a circular orbit after the LM had made its landing.

Perturbation effects

Gravitational anomalies slightly distorting the orbits of some Lunar Orbiters led to the discovery of mass concentrations (dubbed mascons) beneath the lunar surface caused by large impacting bodies at some remote time in the past.  
These anomalies are of sufficient magnitude to cause a lunar orbit to change significantly over the course of several days. They can cause a plumb bob to hang about a third of a degree off vertical, pointing toward the mascon, and increase the force of gravity by one-half percent.
The Apollo 11 first manned landing mission employed the first attempt to correct for the perturbation effect (the frozen orbits were not known at that time).

Study of the mascons' effect on lunar spacecraft led to the discovery in 2001 of "frozen orbits" occurring at four orbital inclinations: 27°, 50°, 76°, and 86°, in which a spacecraft can stay in a low orbit indefinitely. The Apollo 15 subsatellite PFS-1 and the Apollo 16 subsatellite PFS-2, both small satellites released from the Apollo Service Module, contributed to this discovery.  PFS-1 ended up in a long-lasting orbit, at 28° inclination, and successfully completed its mission after one and a half years. PFS-2 was placed in a particularly unstable orbital inclination of 11°, and lasted only 35 days in orbit before crashing into the lunar surface.

See also
Cislunar space
List of orbits
Orbital mechanics
Distant retrograde orbit
Near-rectilinear halo orbit

References

Moon
Orbit of the Moon